The Tanzania national women's football team, is the national team of Tanzania and is controlled by the Tanzania Football Federation. They are nicknamed the Twiga Stars.

The Twiga Stars qualified for their first CAF Women's Championship finals on 5 June 2010, after defeating Eritrea 11–4 on aggregate.

History

2010
The Twiga Stars defeated Ethiopia in the preliminary round of the 2010 African Women's Football Championship on aggregate 4–2. The first leg was played in Addis Ababa on 8 March. Tanzania won the match 3–1, with goals by Ester Chabruma, Mwanahamis Omary, and Asha Rashid. The return leg played at Uhuru Stadium in Dar es Salaam on 29 March ended in a 1–1 draw.

In the first round of the African Championship, Tanzania defeated Eritrea on aggregate 11–4. The Twiga Stars won 8–1 in Dar es Salaam on 23 May and drew 3–3 in Asmara on 5 June.

After the Twiga Stars' success in qualifying for the African Championship finals in South Africa, a Tanzanian businesswoman, Rahma Al-Kharoosi, sponsored them to train in the United States for two weeks in August 2010. Tanzanian President Jakaya Kikwete donated 53 million Tanzanian shillings (approximately US$30,000) on 9 June to cover training camp expenses and allowances before the championship tournament.

Tanzania lost all three games in Group A of the African Championship, to host South Africa 2–1 on 31 October, Mali 3–2 on 4 November, and Nigeria 3–0 on 7 November.

They are the subject of 2010 documentary film Twiga Stars: Tanzania's Soccer Sisters by Nisha Ligon.

2011
Tanzania qualified for the 2011 All-Africa Games in Maputo when its opponents in the qualifying rounds, Kenya, Uganda, and Sudan, declined to play. The Twiga Stars finished in third place in the four-team Group B at the games. They lost to Ghana 2–1 on 5 September, drew with South Africa 2–2 on 8 September, and drew with Zimbabwe 2–2 on 11 September.

2012
In the preliminary round of the 2012 African Women's Championship, Tanzania defeated Namibia 2–0 in Windhoek on 14 January and 5–2 in Dar es Salaam on 29 January. In the first round, Tanzania lost to Ethiopia 2–1 in Addis Ababa on 27 May and 1–0 in Dar es Salaam on 16 June. Tanzania thus failed to qualify for the finals of the African Championship in Equatorial Guinea. The head coach, Charles Boniface Mkwasa, resigned two days after the last match with Ethiopia, and the following day, Nasra Mohammed, the assistant coach, blamed inadequate financial support from the Tanzania Football Federation for the failure to advance.

On 21 June, Mkwasa admitted that he had dismissed several players from the team after discovering that they had engaged in homosexual acts.

It is true that some of the players engaged themselves in homosexuality, but we removed them from the team as soon as we learnt of their behaviour. We took the decision regardless of the player's ability and contribution in the team. There is this problem that these players want to behave like their male counterparts, because they play football, they want to look like men players. But I have always been very tough on this. I have been talking to them, trying to counsel them on how they should behave and I think there is tremendous change on that area and of course their discipline is generally good.

At a subsequent news conference, Mkwasa claimed he had been misquoted. Lina Mhando, the chairperson of Tanzania Women Football, called it a "non-existing scandal" and said there is no concrete proof of the allegations. The team manager, Furaha Francis, said that regardless of whether the scandal exists, it has been blown out of proportion and that there is no proof to substantiate the allegations.

2014
Zambia defeated Tanzania in the first round of qualifying for the 2014 African Women's Football Championship on aggregate 3–2.

2015
Tanzania has qualified for the 2015 All-Africa Games in Brazzaville, Republic of the Congo by defeating Zambia in the second round of qualifying on aggregate 6–5.

Results and fixtures

The following is a list of match results in the last 12 months, as well as any future matches that have been scheduled.

Legend

2022

2023

Coaching staff

Current Coaching staff

As of November 2020

Manager history

Rogasian Kaijage (????–2021)
Bakari Shime(2021–2022)
 Oscar Mirambo( 2022–present)

Players

Current squad
 This is the Final Squad named on August 2022 For 2022 COSAFA Women's Championship  .
 Caps and goals accurate up to and including 30 October 2021.

Recent call-ups
The following players have been called up to a Tanzania squad in the past 12 months.

Previous squads
COSAFA Women's Championship
2020 COSAFA Women's Championship squad
2022 COSAFA Women's Championship squad
CECAFA Women's Championship
2022 CECAFA Women's Championship squads

Records

 *Active players in bold, statistics correct as of 2020.

Most capped players

Top goalscorers

Competitive record

FIFA Women's World Cup

*Draws include knockout matches decided on penalty kicks.

Olympic Games

*Draws include knockout matches decided on penalty kicks.

Africa Women Cup of Nations

African Games

CECAFA Women's Championship

Honours

Regional
COSAFA Women's Championship
  Champions: 2021

CECAFA Women's Championship
  Champions: 2016, 2018

See also

Sport in Tanzania
Football in Tanzania
Women's football in Tanzania
Tanzania women's national under-20 football team
Tanzania women's national under-17 football team
Tanzania men's national football team

Notes and references

External links
Official website
FIFA profile

African women's national association football teams
Tanzania national football team